Oregon Route 214 is an Oregon state highway which runs from the city of  Woodburn, southeast into Silver Falls State Park in the Cascade foothills, and then loops back west towards Salem.  The northern segment of the highway (between Silverton and Woodburn) is known as the Hillsboro-Silverton Highway No. 140 (see Oregon highways and routes), a designation which continues north on OR 219, and the southern segment (southeast of Silverton) is known as the Silver Creek Falls Highway No. 163.

Route description

OR 214's northern terminus is at the junction with Interstate 5 and OR 219 in the city of Woodburn. (A single diamond interchange serves both OR 219 and OR 214 from the freeway; OR 219 leads west of the interchange and OR 214 heads east). OR 214 then departs from OR 99E and heads southeast.

Outside of Woodburn, OR 214 is a two-lane country road.  The next town of note heading south is Mount Angel, followed by Silverton.  In Silverton, OR 214 intersects with OR 213, which heads north to Molalla and south (southwest) to Salem.

OR 214 continues southeast from Silverton, now as the Silver Falls Highway.  The highway, almost immediately upon leaving the Silverton city limits, starts climbing into the Cascade foothills, until it enters Silver Falls State Park.  Upon entering the park, the highway turns south, and provides several points of access to various park facilities and attractions. Upon leaving the park, the highway heads west towards the Salem area. It terminates near Aumsville at an interchange with OR 22.

One significant alignment change occurred during the 90's.  It used to be the case that OR 214, rather than having its northern terminus in  Woodburn, instead continued west towards St. Paul, where it terminated at an intersection with OR 219 (which continued south to Salem on River Road).  However, that section of OR 219 is no longer signed as a state route, and the section of OR 214 between St. Paul and Woodburn was renumbered as OR 219.   Many maps (including Yahoo Maps) still show the old alignments of OR 219 and OR 214.

Major intersections

References

214
Transportation in Marion County, Oregon